Joanna Laurens (born 21 April 1978) is an English playwright.

Education

She read music at the Guidhall School of Music and Drama before moving to Belfast to read English at Queen's University Belfast before completing an MA in creative writing at the University of East Anglia in 2003.

Career

Laurens' first play, The Three Birds (2000), opened at the Gate Theatre, London.  This was followed by Five Gold Rings (2003), at the Almeida Theatre, London, and Poor Beck (2004), at The Other Place in a production by the Royal Shakespeare Company.

Award include:  Critics' Circle Theatre Awards for Most Promising Playwright (2000); Time Out award for Most Outstanding New Talent (2001); finalist & Special Commendation for the Susan Smith Blackburn Prize.

Plays 
  The Three Birds (2000)
  Five Gold Rings (2003)
  Poor Beck (2004)

References

1978 births
Living people
Alumni of Queen's University Belfast
Alumni of the University of East Anglia
21st-century English women writers
British women dramatists and playwrights
Writers from Bristol
Jersey writers